Cock o' the Walk is a Silly Symphonies animated Disney short film. It was released in 1935.

Plot

The titular Cock comes home, a boxing champion laden with golden trophies, and the birds of the fowl run to greet him with a Busby Berkley-esque display. A pretty young Hen is being courted by a young Rooster who gives a crow after a kiss, but her head is turned by the strong, charismatic and confident Cock. They go into a dance with each other, that gets some other types of bird involved into dancing too. The Rooster, furious at his love interest getting taken, challenges the Cock to a fight, and is being soundly beaten until the Hen discovers a photograph of the Cock with a plump hen and multiple chicks, on which is written 'To our Daddy'. She then shoves the paper and slaps the Cock's face for being a cheater, then rushes over to the beaten Rooster. Trying to revive him, she kisses the Rooster, who is so exhilarated by the experience that he gives a mighty crow and roar and beats the Cock without effort, making the Cock land on one of his trophies unconscious. The Rooster and the Hen reconcile with a dance, then after another passionate kiss, the rooster gives another crow.

Home media
The short was released on December 19, 2006, on Walt Disney Treasures: More Silly Symphonies, Volume Two.

References

External links
 
 

1935 films
1935 short films
1935 animated films
1930s Disney animated short films
Silly Symphonies
Films directed by Ben Sharpsteen
Films produced by Walt Disney
Animated films about chickens
Cockfighting in film
Films set on farms
Animated films without speech
American animated short films